Maarefi (also Romanized as Ma‘ārefī and Mo‘ārefī; also known as Mārfi, Mo‘ārefī Shīān, and Mo‘arefī-ye Sheyān) is a village in Shiyan Rural District, in the Central District of Eslamabad-e Gharb County, Kermanshah Province, Iran. At the 2006 census, its population was 314, in 64 families.

References 

Populated places in Eslamabad-e Gharb County